Suzanne Berne (born January 17, 1961 Washington, D.C.) is an American novelist known for her foreboding character studies involving unexpected domestic and psychological drama in bucolic suburban settings. Berne's debut novel, A Crime in the Neighborhood, won the 1999 Orange Prize for Fiction.

Life
Berne attended Georgetown Day School. She was educated at Wesleyan University and the Iowa Writers' Workshop, and received a National Endowment for the Arts fellowship. Berne has taught at both Harvard University and Wellesley College. She is an associate English professor at Boston College.

Berne currently lives in Boston with her husband and two daughters.

Career
Berne's debut novel, A Crime in the Neighborhood, won the Orange Prize. The novel, set in 1972, is told through the eyes of ten-year-old Marsha, and chronicles the murder of a young boy in a quiet suburb of Washington, D.C. against the backdrop of the unfolding Watergate scandal. 

The Ghost at the Table explores the dramatic territory between two sisters' differing versions of their shared history.

A Perfect Arrangement tells of the complex and increasingly disturbing relationship between a normal suburban family and their exceptionally perfect nanny.

Works
Ladies, Gentlemen, Friends and Relations, University of Iowa, 1985
A Crime in the Neighborhood: A Novel, Algonquin Books, 1997, 
The Ghost at the Table, Algonquin Books, 1997, (reprint 2007)
A Perfect Arrangement: A Novel, Algonquin Books, 2001, 
Missing Lucile: Memories of the Grandmother I Never Knew, Algonquin Books of Chapel Hill, 2010,

References

External links

Suzanneberne.net

20th-century American novelists
American women novelists
Living people
Writers from Washington, D.C.
Wesleyan University alumni
Iowa Writers' Workshop alumni
Harvard University faculty
Wesleyan University faculty
Boston College faculty
1961 births
21st-century American novelists
20th-century American women writers
21st-century American women writers
Novelists from Massachusetts
Novelists from Connecticut
Georgetown Day School alumni
American women academics